Fulwood F.C. was an English association football club from Sheffield, South Yorkshire. The club competed in the FA Amateur Cup during the 1930s, and won the Sheffield Amateur League in 1932

References

Defunct football clubs in England
Defunct football clubs in South Yorkshire
Sheffield Association League
Sheffield Amateur League